In materials science, the Burgers vector, named after Dutch physicist Jan Burgers, is a vector, often denoted as , that represents the magnitude and direction of the lattice distortion resulting from a dislocation in a crystal lattice.

The vector's magnitude and direction is best understood when the dislocation-bearing crystal structure is first visualized without the dislocation, that is, the perfect crystal structure. Once this encompassing rectangle is drawn, the dislocation can be introduced. This dislocation will have the effect of deforming, not only the perfect crystal structure, but the rectangle as well. The said rectangle could have one of its sides disjoined from the perpendicular side, severing the connection of the length and width line segments of the rectangle at one of the rectangle's corners, and displacing each line segment from each other. What was once a rectangle before the dislocation was introduced is now an open geometric figure, whose opening defines the direction and magnitude of the Burgers vector. Specifically, the breadth of the opening defines the magnitude of the Burgers vector, and, when a set of fixed coordinates is introduced, an angle between the termini of the dislocated rectangle's length line segment and width line segment may be specified.

When calculating the Burgers vector practically, one may draw a rectangular counterclockwise circuit (Burgers circuit) from a starting point to enclose the dislocation (see the picture above). The Burgers vector will be the vector to complete the circuit, i.e., from the end to the start of the circuit.

The direction of the vector depends on the plane of dislocation, which is usually on one of the closest-packed crystallographic planes.  
The magnitude is usually represented by the equation (For BCC and FCC lattices only):

Generally, the Burgers vector of a dislocation is defined by performing a line integral over the distortion field around the dislocation line

In most metallic materials, the magnitude of the Burgers vector for a dislocation is of a magnitude equal to the interatomic spacing of the material, since a single dislocation will offset the crystal lattice by one close-packed crystallographic spacing unit.

In edge dislocations, the Burgers vector and dislocation line are perpendicular to one another. In screw dislocations, they are parallel.

The Burgers vector is significant in determining the yield strength of a material by affecting solute hardening, precipitation hardening and work hardening.
The Burgers vector plays an important role in determining the direction of dislocation line.

See also
 Frank–Read source
 Dislocations

References

Crystallography
Materials science
Mineralogy concepts
Vectors (mathematics and physics)

de:Versetzung (Materialwissenschaft)#Der Burgersvektor